Jacques-Edme Dumont (April 10, 1761 in Paris – February 21, 1844 in Paris) was a French sculptor.

Dumont came from a dynasty of sculptors that included his great-grandfather Pierre Dumont, grandfather François Dumont, father Edme Dumont and son Augustin-Alexandre Dumont.

He was a pupil of Augustin Pajou, and in 1788 he won the Prix de Rome.  From 1788 to 1793, he lived in Italy, after which he returned to his native France, in the hope a commission from the National Convention during the French Revolution.  However he secured no such commission, and began producing small statuettes and medallions for sale.  Later, he received commissions for statues of Louis Henri, Duke of Bourbon, François Séverin Marceau-Desgraviers, and Jean-Baptiste Colbert.  During the Bourbon Restoration, Dumont made a monument to Guillaume-Chrétien de Lamoignon de Malesherbes (1819) and a statue of French general Charles Pichegru, which has since been destroyed.

Dumont was a great portrait sculptor as well, notable examples of his work including a bust of his mother, Marie-Françoise Berthault, and Marie Louise, Duchess of Parma and wife of Napoleon (1810).

He was also the father of virtuoso pianist, teacher and composer Louise Farrenc (née Jeanne-Louise Dumont).

References

External links
 

1761 births
1844 deaths
French sculptors
French male sculptors
Prix de Rome for sculpture